Qatar sent a delegation to compete at the 2008 Summer Paralympics in Beijing, People's Republic of China. It did not win any medals.

Sports

Athletics

Powerlifting

See also
Qatar at the Paralympics
Qatar at the 2008 Summer Olympics

External links
International Paralympic Committee
Beijing 2008 Paralympic Games Official Site

Nations at the 2008 Summer Paralympics
2008
Summer Paralympics